Cabezon Peak is a large volcanic plug that is a prominent feature in northwestern New Mexico. Cabezon Peak is two miles south of the old ghost town of Cabezon and the Rio Puerco. This volcanic neck is formed of basalt and is part of the Mount Taylor volcanic field. A volcanic neck or plug is formed when magma from an existing volcano solidifies in the pipe or neck and the surrounding sediment is eroded away. Marine Cretaceous rocks of the Mancos Shale and Point Lookout Sandstone are exposed around the base of Cabezon Peak.

Cabezon means “big head” in Spanish. This stems from a Navajo myth which holds that it is the head of the giant Ye’i-tsoh after being slain by the twins Nayenezgani and To’badzistsini. The first geologist to study Cabezon Peak was likely Clarence E. Dutton, who also photographed the peak in 1884–1885. Further studies were carried out by Douglas Wilson Johnson in 1907 and C.B. Hunt in 1938. All identified the peak as an exhumed volcanic neck.

Mesa Prieta is south of Cabezon Peak.

Geology
Cabezon Peak is the solidified core of a volcano that erupted 2.658 ± 0.032 million years ago, based on argon-argon dating. The eruption at this volcano likely began with lava fountains from the vent, which built up a scoria cone. Lava later ponded in the interior of the cone, solidifying into a massive plug. Erosion then stripped away the less resistant scoria, leaving the highly resistant plug visible today.

The topmost part of the plug is scoria that remains from the original cone.

The lava erupted at Cabezon Peak was alkaline basalt in composition; that is, a lava relatively low in silica, and moderately enriched in alkali metals. The basalt that solidified from this lava contains visible crystals (phenocrysts) of olivine, clinopyroxene, plagioclase feldspar, and magnetite in a very fine-grained matrix. The origin of the alkaline basalt is uncertain. It may have formed in the upper mantle where hot rock crept upwards beneath the Rio Grande rift.

The basalt of Cabezon Peak contains a small number of xenoliths, fragments of solid rock that were entrained in the magma from the upper mantle or lower crust.

Gallery

References

Further reading
Chronic, Halka, 1987, Roadside Geology of New Mexico: Roadside Geology Series, Mountain Press Publishing Company.
Dictionary of Geological Terms, Anchor Press/Doubleday, third edition
Julyan, Robert, 1998, The Place Names of New Mexico: The University of New Mexico Press, revised edition.

External links

 Cabezon Peak: Weather forecast
 Cabezon Peak: Bureau of Land Management
 Cabezon Peak flyover: YouTube

Volcanoes of New Mexico
Geology of New Mexico
Landforms of Cibola County, New Mexico
Volcanic plugs of the United States